4-Methoxyestradiol (4-ME2) is an endogenous, naturally occurring methoxylated catechol estrogen and metabolite of estradiol that is formed by catechol O-methyltransferase via the intermediate 4-hydroxyestradiol. It has estrogenic activity similarly to estrone and 4-hydroxyestrone.

See also
 2-Methoxyestradiol
 2-Methoxyestriol
 2-Methoxyestrone
 4-Methoxyestrone

References

External links
 Metabocard for 4-Methoxyestradiol - Human Metabolome Database

Secondary alcohols
Estranes
Estrogens
Ethers
Human metabolites
Steroid hormones